Eumenogaster is a genus of moths in the subfamily Arctiinae erected by Gottlieb August Wilhelm Herrich-Schäffer in 1855.

Species
 Eumenogaster affinis Rothschild, 1911
 Eumenogaster baura E. D. Jones, 1914
 Eumenogaster eumenes Herrich-Schäffer, 1856
 Eumenogaster haemacera Hampson, 1898
 Eumenogaster nigricauda Dognin, 1911
 Eumenogaster notabilis Walker, 1864
 Eumenogaster pseudosphecia Hampson, 1898

References

Arctiinae